Saint-Clément is a commune in the Meurthe-et-Moselle department in north-eastern France. It was there that a sister company of the Lunéville Faience manufactory was founded by Jacques Chambrette in 1758. It still produces today both old & modern tableware and decorative ceramics.

See also
Communes of the Meurthe-et-Moselle department

References

Saintclement